Eleanor Caines (1870 or 1880–1913) was an American silent film actress. She spent most of her film career at the Lubin Film Company. Caines died in 1913 in her hometown Philadelphia.

Filmography
Blissville the Beautiful (1909) *short
Three Fingered Jack (1909) *short
The Tattooed Arm (1910)*short
Over the Wire (1910) *short
Marriage in Haste (1910)*short
Back to Boarding (1910)*short
Indian Blood (1910)*short
The Miner's Sweetheart (1910)*short
A Veteran of the G.A.R. (1910)*short
The New Boss of Bar X Ranch (1910)*short
Red Eagle's Love Affair (1910)*short
Faith Lost and Won (1910)*short
The Adopted Daughter (1910)*short
The Stronger Sex (1910)*short
The Sheriff's Capture (1910)*shortLiz's Career (1910)*shortArt and the Legacy (1911)*shortThe Dream of a Moving Picture Director (1912)*shortThe Widow Casey's Return (1912)*shortJust Pretending (1912)*shortA Prize Package (1912)*shortA Red Hot Courtship (1912)*shortHis Pair of Pants (1912)*shortFelix at the Ball (1912)*shortOnce Was Enough (1912)*shortA Guilty Conscience (1913)*shortAn Accidental Dentist (1913)*shortWild Man for a Day (1913)*shortMr. Jinks Buys a Dress (1913)*shortSuch an Appetite (1913)*shortOne on Romance (1913)*shortThe Lost Identity'' (1913)*short

References

External links
 Eleanor Caines at IMDb.com
Eleanor Caine portrait(NYPublic Library)
portrait(archived)
 Eleanor Caines; kinotv.com

1870 births
1913 deaths
Actresses from Philadelphia
American silent film actresses
20th-century American actresses